Lomerizine (INN) (also known as KB-2796) is a diphenylpiperazine class L-type and T-type calcium channel blocker.   This drug is currently used clinically for the treatment of migraines, while also being used experimentally for the treatment of glaucoma and optic nerve injury.

Solubility

Due to its lipophilic nature and small molecular size, lomerizine is able to cross the blood brain barrier.  For delivery in aqueous systems, nanoparticle therapy may be used. Along with lipids, lomerizine is soluble in chloroform, methanol, and DMSO.

Mechanism of Action

Lomerizine works as a calcium antagonist by blocking voltage-dependent calcium channels.  A study using [3H]Nitrendipine showed that lomerizine allosterically inhibits binding in calcium channels at a different site from the 1,4 dihydropyridine binding site. However, its antimigraine effects are believed to be due not to the blocking of calcium channels, but to the antagonizing effects of lomerizine on the 5HT2A receptor. The drug was shown to competitively inhibit binding of [3H]spiperone to 5-HT2A receptors, inhibiting the 5-HT driven release of Ca2+.
Lomerizine treatment of 5-HT2A expressing cells led to the inhibition of Ca2+ release in response to 5-HT, while Ca2+ release in response to ATP was unaffected. By preventing the release of Ca2+, lomerizine prevents serotonin-induced contraction of the basilar artery, which can lead to migraines.

Lomerizine has also been shown to possess neuroprotective effects, specifically in the case of retinal damage.  Doses of .03 mg/kg given intravenously as a pretreatment were shown to prevent glutamate-induced neurotoxicity, while also providing protection against NMDA-induced and kainate-induced neurotoxicity. Lomerizine was shown to have little affinity for NMDA or kainate receptors, so its protectivity against neurotoxicity in these cases is believed to be due to the blocking of Ca2+ influx through voltage-dependent calcium channels.  By blocking these channels and preventing Ca2+ release, lomerizine increases circulation in the optic nerve head. These effects show that lomerizine may prove to be a useful treatment for ischemic retinal diseases, such as glaucoma.

Lomerizine also shows neuroprotective effects against secondary degeneration resulting from injury in retinal ganglion cells.  In this case, increased membrane depolarization, in conjunction with the inability of the sodium-calcium exchanger to function due to depleted ATP stores, causes the activation of calcium-dependent signal transduction.  These processes lead to cell death through either apoptosis or necrosis.  Lomerizine's role in blocking Ca2+ can rescue these cells from death by preventing excitotoxicity.  Decreased intracellular calcium also prevents necrosis by decreasing permeability, and apoptotic death is reduced through the reduction of calcium-dependent apoptotic agents.

While some calcium-channel blockers, such as flunarizine, act on the dopaminergic system, lomerizine is ineffective in vivo at inhibiting the release of dopamine.  However, it has been observed to weakly inhibit the binding of [3H]spiperone to D2 dopamine receptors in vitro.  While researchers are unsure of the reason for this difference, one hypothesis is that the doses administered cannot reach a high enough concentration in the brain to affect D2 receptors.

Medical Use

Lomerizine is typically taken orally in a dose of 2 to 10 mg two to three times a day, but doses of 20 mg are not uncommon.  It is also available in an intravenous solution of lomerizine hydrochloride, but the preferred route of administration, especially for treatment of the optic nerve, is oral.

In a clinical study, long-term lomerizine usage was shown to be both safe and effective in the treatment of migraines.  However, efficacy of the drug decreases with age, with a significant correlation between age and efficacy at preventing migraine attacks.  Efficacies of 47% to 71% have been reported, and gender seems to have no effect on efficacy of the drug.

Lomerizine may cause drowsiness and flushing, but it lacks the serious cardiovascular effects and hypotension produced by other calcium antagonists.  This is hypothesized to be due to the drug's selectivity for cerebral arteries over peripheral arteries.  No other side effects have been reported.

The acute toxicity for lomerizine in mice was found to be 44 mg/kg intravenously, 300 mg/kg orally, and over 1,200 mg/kg subcutaneously.  Overdose can result in seizures or convulsions.  The toxicity in humans has not been reported.

Pharmacokinetics

Administered intravenously in rabbits at a dose of .03 mg/kg, the drug reached an average peak plasma concentration of 19.5 ± 6.5 ng/ml.  This preparation had been completely metabolised within 60 minutes of administration. When administered to rats at a dose of 5 mg/kg, lomerizine reached a Cmax of 27.6 ng/ML and Tmax of 90 minutes.  In guinea pig and dog aortic membranes, the drug displaced the binding of calcium agonist 3H-Nitrendipine with an IC50 of 86 nM and a Ki of 340 nM.

When administered orally to healthy male subjects in 10, 20, and 40 mg doses, lomerizine produced peak plasma levels of ≈ 7.3, 15.7, and 31.3 ng/ml. In a group of 18 healthy adults, 10 mg of lomerizine administered orally had a half-life of 5.48 ± .90 hours, with a peak serum concentration (Cmax) of 9.06 ± 2.46 ng/mL.  Tmax was reported as 2.72 ± .91 hours

The IC50 for lomerizine is reported to be 2430.0 nM in humans.  The bioavailability of orally administered lomerizine is unaffected by gastric pH.

Synthesis
The precursor for Lomerizine can be seen to be Trimetazidine. Alternatively, a Flunarizine type synthesis is documented.

The reduction of 4,4'-Difluorobenzophenone [345-92-6] (1) with sodium borohydride gives 4,4'-Difluorobenzhydrol [365-24-2] (2). The halogenation with concentrated muriatic acid gives 4,4'-Difluorobenzhydryl chloride [27064-94-4] (3). Alkylation with a single equivalent of piperazine leads to 1-[bis(4-fluorophenyl)methyl]piperazine [27469-60-9] (4). The halogenation of 2,3,4-Trimethoxybenzyl Alcohol [71989-96-3] (5) with phosphorus tribromide gives 2,3,4-trimethoxybenzyl bromide [80054-01-9] (6). Joining both fragements then completes the synthesis of Lomerizine (7).

References

Bis(4-fluorophenyl)methanes
Cyclizines
Pyrogallol ethers
Antimigraine drugs
Calcium channel blockers